Ascot Corner (2021 population 3,368) is a municipality in Le Haut-Saint-François Regional County Municipality in the Estrie region of Quebec.

Demographics

Population

Notes

External links

Municipalities in Quebec
Incorporated places in Estrie
Le Haut-Saint-François Regional County Municipality